This is a list of electoral district results for the 2007 New South Wales state election.

Results by electoral district

Albury

Auburn

Ballina

Balmain

Bankstown

Barwon

Bathurst

Baulkham Hills

Bega

Blacktown

Blue Mountains

Burrinjuck

Cabramatta

Camden

Campbelltown

Canterbury

Castle Hill

Cessnock

Charlestown

Clarence

Coffs Harbour

Coogee

Cronulla

Davidson

Drummoyne

Dubbo

East Hills

Epping

Fairfield

Gosford

Goulburn

Granville

Hawkesbury

Heathcote

Heffron

Hornsby

Keira

Kiama

Kogarah

Ku-ring-gai

Lake Macquarie

Lakemba

Lane Cove

Lismore

Liverpool

Londonderry

Macquarie Fields

Maitland

Manly

Maroubra

Marrickville

Menai

Miranda

Monaro

Mount Druitt

Mulgoa

Murray-Darling

Murrumbidgee

Myall Lakes

Newcastle

North Shore

Northern Tablelands

Oatley

Orange

Oxley

Parramatta

Penrith

Pittwater

Port Macquarie

Port Stephens

Riverstone

Rockdale

Ryde

Shellharbour

Smithfield

South Coast

Strathfield

Swansea

Sydney

Tamworth

Terrigal

The Entrance

Toongabbie

Tweed

Upper Hunter

Vaucluse

Wagga Wagga

Wakehurst

Wallsend

Willoughby

Wollondilly

Wollongong

Wyong

See also
 Candidates of the 2007 New South Wales state election
 Members of the New South Wales Legislative Assembly, 2007–2011

Notes

References

2007